Ohad Edelstein (born 25 May 1992) is an Israeli footballer who currently plays at Maccabi Yavne.

External links
 

1992 births
Living people
Israeli footballers
Jewish Israeli sportspeople
Footballers from Giv'at Shmuel
Hapoel Petah Tikva F.C. players
Hapoel Katamon Jerusalem F.C. players
Maccabi Kiryat Gat F.C. players
Hapoel Ashkelon F.C. players
Maccabi Yavne F.C. players
F.C. Kafr Qasim players
Hapoel Marmorek F.C. players
Liga Leumit players
Association football forwards